Hamadryas arete is a species of cracker butterfly in the family Nymphalidae. It is found in Bolivia, Brazil, and Paraguay.

References

Hamadryas (butterfly)
Lepidoptera of Brazil
Nymphalidae of South America
 Butterflies described in 1847